The northern rock mouse (Peromyscus nasutus) is a species of rodent in the family Cricetidae. It is found in Mexico and the United States.

References

Musser, G. G. and M. D. Carleton. (2005). Superfamily Muroidea. pp. 894–1531 in Mammal Species of the World a Taxonomic and Geographic Reference. D. E. Wilson and D. M. Reeder eds. Johns Hopkins University Press, Baltimore.

Peromyscus
Mammals described in 1891
Taxonomy articles created by Polbot